Bhimrao Ambedkar is an Indian politician from the Bahujan Samaj Party and a member of the Uttar Pradesh Legislative Council.

Political career

MLC
In the elections on 23 March 2018, BJP won 11 out of 13 seats and the remaining two were won by Samajwadi Party and Bahujan Samaj Party each. Ambedkar became a member of the Uttar Pradesh Legislative Council.

He had earlier unsuccessfully contested the Rajya Sabha elections in 2018 where he was defeated by Anil Agrawal of the Bharatiya Janata Party.

MLA
He was elected from the Vidhan Sabha constituency Lakhna seat in the 2007 Uttar Pradesh state assembly elections and MLC U.P. in 2018. He was candidate of MP Rajya Sabha but due to some political situation he could not be elected.

He was named after the Indian leader B. R. Ambedkar.

References

Year of birth missing (living people)
Living people
Bahujan Samaj Party politicians from Uttar Pradesh
Uttar Pradesh MLAs 2007–2012
Place of birth missing (living people)
University of Allahabad alumni